Śniadków Dolny  is a village in Otwock County, Gmina Sobienie-Jeziory.The  population is near 250. From 1975 to 1998 village was in Siedlce Voivodeship.

Sniadkow Dolny